The Republican People's Party is a political party in Turkey.

Republican People's Party may also refer to:

Republican People's Party (Egypt)
Republican People's Party (El Salvador)
Republican People's Party (Kazakhstan)
Republican People's Party (Moldova), now called "Our Party"

See also
 People's Republican Party (disambiguation)
 Republican Party (disambiguation)
 People's Party (disambiguation)